Lutz Unger (born 19 June 1951) is a retired East German swimmer. He competed at the 1972 Summer Olympics in the 4 × 100 m medley and 4 × 100 m and 4 × 200 m freestyle relays and finished in second, third and sixth place, respectively. He won three medals in these relays at the 1970 European Aquatics Championships.

References

1951 births
Living people
People from Wernigerode
East German male swimmers
German male freestyle swimmers
Olympic swimmers of East Germany
Swimmers at the 1972 Summer Olympics
Olympic silver medalists for East Germany
Olympic bronze medalists for East Germany
Olympic bronze medalists in swimming
European Aquatics Championships medalists in swimming
Medalists at the 1972 Summer Olympics
Olympic silver medalists in swimming
Sportspeople from Saxony-Anhalt